is a retired professional Japanese baseball player. He played pitcher for the Chunichi Dragons.

Kawai announced his retirement on 23 September 2016, and played his final game for the Dragons against the Hanshin Tigers at Nagoya Dome pitching 5 straight deliveries in a row to retire the pinch hitting Shunsuke Fujikawa.

References

External links

 NPB.com

1980 births
Living people
Baseball people from Nagano Prefecture
Japanese expatriate baseball players in the Dominican Republic
Nippon Professional Baseball pitchers
Chunichi Dragons players
Leones del Escogido players